José Domingues dos Santos (5 August 1885 – 16 August 1958) was a Portuguese politician, jurist, professor and journalist who, among other positions, served as President of the Council of Ministers (Prime Minister) of one of the many governments of the Portuguese First Republic (1924-1925). He was a member of the free masonry, at least since 1922.

References

1885 births
1958 deaths
Naval ministers of Portugal
People from Matosinhos
Prime Ministers of Portugal
Labor ministers
Portuguese republicans
Portuguese journalists
Male journalists
20th-century journalists